Arama is a genus of flies in the family Tachinidae. It contains only one species, Arama gobica.

References

Diptera of Asia
Exoristinae
Tachinidae genera